Semionotiformes is an order of primitive, ray-finned, primarily freshwater fish from the Middle Triassic (Anisian) to the Late Cretaceous (Maastrichtian). The best-known genus is Semionotus of Europe and North America. Their closest living relatives are gars (Lepisosteidae), with both groups belonging to the clade Ginglymodi within the Holostei.

Classification
 Order †Semionotiformes Arambourg & Bertin 1958 sensu López-Arbarello 2012
 Genus ?†Orthurus Kner 1866
 Genus †Sangiorgioichthys Tintori & Lombardo 2007
 Genus †Luoxiongichthys Wen et al. 2011
 Genus †Aphanepygus Bassani 1879
 Genus †Placidichthys Brito 2000
 Family †Pleurolepididae Lütken 1871
 Genus †Pleurolepis Agassiz 1863 non Quenstedt 1852
 Family †Macrosemiidae Wagner 1860a corrig. Cope 1889 sensu Murray & Wilson 2009 [Macrosemii Wagner 1860a]
 Genus †Eusemius Vetter 1881
 Genus †Blenniomoeus Costa 1850 [Calignathus Costa 1853]
 Genus †Enchelyolepis Woodward 1918
 Genus †Palaeomacrosemius Ebert, Lane & Kolbl-Ebert 2016
 Genus †Voelklichthys Arratia & Schultze 2012
 Genus †Notagogus Agassiz 1833-1844 [Neonotagogus Bravi 1994]
 Genus †Agoultichthys Murray & Wilson 2009
 Genus †Histionotus Egerton 1854
 Genus †Propterus Agassiz 1833-1844 [Rhynchoncodes Costa 1850]
 Genus †Macrosemiocotzus González-Rodríguez, Applegate & Espinosa-Arrubarrena 2004
 Genus †Legnonotus Egerton 1853
 Genus †Macrosemius Agassiz 1833-1844
 Family †Semionotidae Woodward 1890 sensu López-Arbarello 2012
 Genus †Semionotus Agassiz 1832
 Genus †Sargodon Plieninger 1847
 Family †Callipurbeckiidae López-Arbarello 2012 [Paralepidotidae Hadding 1919 ex Lund 1920]
 Genus †Occitanichthys López-Arbarello & Wencker 2016
 Genus †Semiolepis Lombardo & Tintori 2008
 Genus †Paralepidotus Stolley 1919
 Genus †Macrosemimimus Schröder, López-Arbarello & Ebert 2012
 Genus †Tlayuamichin López-Arbarello & Alvarado-Ortega 2011
 Genus †Callipurbeckia López-Arbarello 2012

Timeline of genera

References

 
Prehistoric ray-finned fish orders
Lopingian first appearances
Late Cretaceous extinctions